Precisely is a dramatic sketch by the English playwright Harold Pinter.

Pinter wrote "Precisely" for The Big One, a theatrical evening arranged by the peace movement at London's Apollo Theatre, on 18 December 1983. Directed by the author, the sketch concerns two men, Stephen and Roger, who argue about the exact number of a figure, whether 20 million or more. It becomes clear that they are talking about body counts.

Original cast
Stephen - Barry Foster
Roger - Martin Jarvis

References

Charles Grimes, Harold Pinter's politics: a silence beyond echo 

1983 plays
 Precisely (sketch)